Gulag is a 1985 drama film by Roger Young, aired originally on HBO and later released to home video. It was reviewed by the New York Times.

Plot
TV reporter and former star athlete Mickey Almon is covering an international athletic event in Moscow when he is arrested by the KGB after being approached by a scientist wanting him to smuggle secret information out of the Soviet Union.  Almon is imprisoned and interrogated over several days by prison official Bukovsky who ultimately forces him to confess to being a spy for the United States.  Though promised with release for doing so, Almon is instead transported to a railway station and placed aboard a train on a Stolypin prison car with other political prisoners bound for a Gulag labour camp near the Arctic Circle.

After arriving, Almon meets a fellow foreign prisoner, a heroic Englishman who teaches him how to survive the brutal life of the camp.  In time, after learning that his ultimate fate in the camp will eventually be death through hazardous labour, Almon and the Englishman conspire together to plot an escape to Norway.

Cast
David Keith as Mickey Almon
Malcolm McDowell as Kenneth "Englishman"  Barrington
David Suchet as Matvei
Warren Clarke as Hooker
John McEnery as Diczek
 Nancy Paul as Susan Almon
Brian Pettifer as Vlasov
George Pravda as Bukovsky
Eugene Lipinski as Yuri
Shane Rimmer as Jay
Ray Jewers as TV Interviewer
Bogdan Kominowski as Stolypin Guard

Production
Lorimar claimed the story was based on fact. It was shot in London and in Norway.

Home media

The film was released on VHS and Betamax by Prism Entertainment under license from Lorimar. But, this film was produced by Lorimar Productions and it belongs to same company (subsequently later it owned by Warner Bros.) originally. However, it never released on DVD or Blu-ray by Warner Bros. Home Entertainment.

References

External links

1985 films
1985 drama films
Films directed by Roger Young
1980s prison films
Films set in the Soviet Union
Cold War films
HBO Films films
Warner Bros. films
Works about the Gulag